Brekke may refer to:

Places
Brekke, a former municipality in Sogn og Fjordane county, Norway
Brekke (village), a village in Gulen municipality in Sogn og Fjordane county, Norway
Brekke Church, a church in Gulen municipality in Sogn og Fjordane county, Norway
Brekke sluser, a part of the Halden Canal

People
Aslak Brekke (1901–1978), prominent vocalist of one of the Scandinavian poetic genres referred to as stev
Birger Brekke (1891–1981), Norwegian Scout leader
Eden T. Brekke (1893–1978), Chicago businessman and politician
Jan Egil Brekke (born 1974), Norwegian football midfielder who currently plays for Alta IF
Jan-Paul Brekke (born 1966), Norwegian sociologist and comedian
Johanne Brekke, Welsh sport shooter
Leif Arne Brekke (born 1977), Norwegian football defender who currently plays for Modum FK
Michele Brekke, former flight director in NASA Johnson Space Center (JSC) Space Shuttle Mission Control Center
Morten Brekke (born 1957), Norwegian former wrestler who competed in the Summer Olympics
Paal Brekke (1923–1993), Norwegian lyricist, novelist, translator of poetry, and literary critic
Pål Brekke (born 1961), Norwegian solar physicist astrophysicist
Ruth Lilian Brekke (born 1938), Norwegian politician for the Conservative Party
Sigve Brekke (born 1959), business leader and a former politician of Norwegian origin
Toril Brekke (born 1949), Norwegian novelist, writer of short stories, children's writer, biographer, translator and literary critic